The 1989 US Open was a tennis tournament played on outdoor hard courts at the USTA National Tennis Center in New York City in the United States. It was the 109th edition of the US Open and was held from August 28 to September 10, 1989.

Seniors

Men's singles

 Boris Becker defeated  Ivan Lendl 7–6(7–2), 1–6, 6–3, 7–6(7–4)
 It was Becker's 4th career Grand Slam title and his only US Open title.

Women's singles

 Steffi Graf defeated  Martina Navratilova 3–6, 7–5, 6–1 
 It was Graf's 9th career Grand Slam title and her 2nd US Open title.

Men's doubles

 John McEnroe /  Mark Woodforde defeated  Ken Flach /  Robert Seguso 6–4, 4–6, 6–3, 6–3 
 It was McEnroe's 16th career Grand Slam title and his 8th and last US Open title. It was Woodforde's 1st career Grand Slam title and his 1st US Open title.

Women's doubles

 Hana Mandlíková /  Martina Navratilova defeated  Mary Joe Fernández /  Pam Shriver 5–7, 6–4, 6–4
 It was Mandlíková's 5th and last career Grand Slam title and her 2nd US Open title. It was Navratilova's 52nd career Grand Slam title and her 14th US Open title.

Mixed doubles

 Robin White /  Shelby Cannon defeated  Meredith McGrath /  Rick Leach 3–6, 6–2, 7–5
 It was White's 2nd and last career Grand Slam title and her 2nd US Open title. It was Cannon's only career Grand Slam title.

Juniors

Boys' singles

 Jonathan Stark defeated  Nicklas Kulti 6–4, 6–1

Girls' singles

 Jennifer Capriati defeated  Rachel McQuillan 6–2, 6–3

Boys' doubles

 Wayne Ferreira /  Grant Stafford defeated  Martin Damm /  Jan Kodeš Jr. 6–3, 6–4

Girls' doubles

 Jennifer Capriati /  Meredith McGrath defeated  Jo-Anne Faull /  Rachel McQuillan 6–0, 6–3

Coverage
Television coverage included eighty hours of programming over a 12-day period. Live coverage began on August 28, 1989, and concluded with the final of the Women's Doubles on September 10, 1989.  The four final days of televised coverage consisted of four men's singles matches (two quarterfinals, one semifinal and the final), three women's singles matches (two semifinals and the final), one men's doubles match (the final), two women's doubles matches (a semifinal and the final) and one mixed doubles match (the final).

Notes and references

External links
 Official US Open website

 
 

 
US Open
US Open (tennis) by year
US Open
US Open
US Open
US Open